Andahuaylas Airport  is a high-elevation airport serving Andahuaylas, Peru. It is an important airport in the Apurímac Region as being the only one capable of receiving commercial flights. It is operated by the civil government. Apart from its scheduled flights, it also has many charter flights.

There is high terrain in all quadrants.

See also 
Transport in Peru
List of airports in Peru
List of highest commercial airports

References

External links 
SkyVector Aeronautical Charts
OurAirports - Andahuaylas

Airports in Peru
Buildings and structures in Apurímac Region